Eagle Hill is a mountain in Sabine Parish, Louisiana. It is the among the highest points in Louisiana, at 459 feet at its highest.

Location
This hill is primarily part of the foothills leading to the Ouachita Mountains in Arkansas.

References

Landmarks in Louisiana
Mountains of Louisiana